Adam Scott Graves (born April 12, 1968) is a Canadian former professional hockey player. He served 10 seasons with the New York Rangers of the National Hockey League (NHL). He also played for the Detroit Red Wings, Edmonton Oilers and San Jose Sharks in a career that spanned from 1987 to 2003. He finished his career with 329 goals, 287 assists and 1,224 penalty minutes. He is currently a New York Rangers special assistant with Prospect Development and Community Relations.

Playing career 
As a youth, Graves played in the 1981 Quebec International Pee-Wee Hockey Tournament with a minor ice hockey team from Wexford, Toronto.

Graves started playing Junior B hockey with King City, Ontario, north of his birthplace in Toronto. Graves then joined the Windsor Spitfires of the Ontario Hockey League (OHL) in 1985–86 and averaged over one point per game as a rookie in the OHL. He was drafted 22nd overall by the Detroit Red Wings in the 1986 NHL Entry Draft.

The 1986–87 season was his breakout year, when he scored 45 goals for the Spitfires. He led his team to the OHL championship in the Memorial Cup tournament. In the 1987–88 season, Graves played primarily for the Spitfires, but was called up to play nine games with Detroit.

The 1988–89 season would be Graves' first season as an NHL regular. He played in 56 games for the Red Wings while splitting time with the Adirondack minor league club, but was only able to score seven goals. During his brief tenure with the Red Wings, with whom he amassed 60 penalty minutes in 1988–89 and 13 in 1989–90, Graves earned the reputation as an agitator who played on the edge and often went over it. According to Hockeyfights.com, he took part in 52 fights in his NHL career. 

On November 2 of the 1989-90 campaign, Graves was involved in a blockbuster trade with the Edmonton Oilers. Along with Graves, the Oilers received Petr Klima, Joe Murphy and Jeff Sharples in exchange for Jimmy Carson, Kevin McClelland and Edmonton's fifth-round draft pick in the 1991 NHL Entry Draft. The trade was lamented at the time in Edmonton —- the high-scoring Klima had run-ins with the law and a history of substance abuse, Sharples was coming off a shoulder injury, and Murphy and Graves were considered to be underachievers given their high draft status.  Red Wings general manager Jim Devellano was reluctant to part with Graves, but felt that obtaining Detroit-area native Carson was worth it. The trade paid immediate dividends for the Oilers, as Klima finished with 30 goals, while Graves and Murphy provided depth up front. Graves would go on to score 11 points in the playoffs, en route to defeating the Boston Bruins for the Edmonton Oilers' fifth Stanley Cup.

"It was such an excellent team atmosphere," said Graves of his brief stint with the Oilers. "We were together as any group of guys in the league. Everyone felt that they were a part of the team- no one felt left out. Because of that, even if you had a small role on the team, you were happy. You were glad to be able to give whatever little you could to the team. You did everything you could. I have many wonderful memories in my two years with the Oilers. I thoroughly enjoyed my time with the team."

But Graves spent only two seasons with the Oilers before they allowed him to leave as a free agent at the conclusion of the 1990–91 campaign. He signed an offer sheet for five years and $2.44 million with the New York Rangers, where he would join former Edmonton Oilers teammates Mark Messier and Jeff Beukeboom. Neil Smith, the general manager of the Rangers, was familiar with Graves, having earlier served as the Red Wings' director of scouting. In 1991-92, Graves' first season with the Rangers, he scored 26 goals, helping the team to a 105-point, Presidents' Trophy-winning regular season that was punctuated by a major disappointment in the playoffs. Graves finished fifth in the voting for the Frank J. Selke Trophy as the best defensive forward in the league.

Graves performance was marred by an ugly incident in Game 2 of the Patrick Division finals against the Pittsburgh Penguins, when he fractured the left wrist of superstar Mario Lemieux with a vicious two-handed swing of his stick. Lemieux was adamant that Rangers head coach Roger Neilson had "engineered a hit" that sidelined him for five games. 

"It was intentional, no question about it," Lemieux said of the incident during the Stanley Cup finals that season. "I've never been hit that hard in my life. I'm not saying Roger Neilson told Graves to go after me, but he told his players to go after me."

Graves was assessed only a minor penalty on the play and allowed to take part in Game 3, in which he scored the first goal of a 6-5 overtime victory. After he was suspended for the remainder of the series, the Penguins rallied to win the next three games and the series on the way to the Stanley Cup championship. 

Although Graves continued to improve in the 1992–93 season, tallying 36 goals and 65 points, the Rangers failed to make the playoffs.

During the 1993–94 season, Graves scored 52 goals, setting a New York Rangers' franchise record for most goals in a season. (Jaromír Jágr would later score 54 in 2005–06). In the spring of 1994, Graves helped the Rangers win their first Stanley Cup since the 1939–40 season. Graves was awarded a roster spot on the NHL's second All-Star team at the position of left wing, and was the recipient of the King Clancy Memorial Trophy in recognition of his continuing work with charitable causes. Graves is one of the seven alumni of the Oilers dynasty to win the Stanley Cup with the 1993–94 New York Rangers, along with Jeff Beukeboom, Glenn Anderson, Kevin Lowe, Craig MacTavish, Mark Messier and Esa Tikkanen.

Graves remained productive during his tenure with the Rangers, being a consistent 20 to 30 goal scorer until the 1999–2000 campaign. Although the Rangers would not return to the hey-day of their 1993–94 campaign, Graves remained one of the team's most popular players. After winning the Bill Masterton Trophy in 2001, he was traded to the San Jose Sharks in exchange for Mikael Samuelsson and Christian Gosselin. Graves played with the Sharks organization for two years, totalling 49 total points, before announcing his retirement in April 2004.

Currently, Graves is an instructor at the New York Rangers' youth hockey camp.

Personal life
Graves grew up in Toronto (North York) with his parents Henry (a police officer stationed in Cabbagetown, Toronto) and Lynda Graves. Graves has two older sisters, Richenda and Lynette, as well as a younger adopted brother, Mark. The Graves family also took in as many as 40 foster children. He and his wife, Violet, are the parents of four children. They reside in Oakville, Ontario.

In popular culture
In the 1999 movie Big Daddy, Peter Dante is wearing Graves' New York Rangers #9 jersey, complete with the alternate captain emblem on the chest. The "G" and "S" were digitally removed for contractual reasons as the producers of the film wanted to avoid paying licensing rights to the NHLPA for the use of Graves's jersey, as Graves was an active player at the time of filming.

Awards
During the 1993–94 season, Graves was awarded with the King Clancy Memorial Trophy which is given annually to the NHL player who best exemplifies leadership qualities or has made a noteworthy humanitarian contribution to his community. Graves also won the NHL foundation award during the 1999–2000 season. This award is given annually to the player who applies core values of hockey, commitment and teamwork to enrich the lives of people in the community.

During the 1991–92, 1992–93, 1993–94, 1998–99 and 1999–2000 seasons, Graves received the Steven McDonald Award, given annually to the Rangers player who goes "above and beyond the call of duty", named after a paralyzed New York Police Department officer Steven McDonald.

The Players' Player Award which is given to the best "team player" as voted on by the players was also won by Graves in 1991–92, 1992–93, 1994–95 and 1998–99. In the 1992–93 and 1993–94 seasons, Graves won the Rangers Most Valuable Player Award given to the Rangers most valuable player as voted on by the media. Also during the 1992–93 season, Graves was given the "Rangers Good Guy" award. During the Rangers' Stanley Cup-winning season, Graves was awarded the Frank Boucher Trophy, given by the Rangers Fan Club given to the most popular player on and off the ice. Yet another fan club award Graves was awarded the "Rangers Fan Club Ceil Saidel Memorial Award" during the 1995–96, 1996–97 and 1999–2000 seasons. This award is for dedication on and off the ice.

In 1993, Graves also awarded the "Crumb Bum Award" given annually for services to New York youngsters as voted on by the media. Another "Good Guy" award Graves won was The Sporting News "Good guy" award in 2000. Along with other professional athletes such as Al Leiter, Troy Aikman and Terry Cummings this award was given to charitable and community service efforts. Graves is now an instructor at the New York Rangers youth hockey camp. He focuses on instilling pride in the youngsters attending the camp.

He also won the Bill Masterton Memorial Trophy in the 2000–01 season.

On February 3, 2009, the New York Rangers retired Graves' No. 9 jersey before a game against the Atlanta Thrashers, joining fellow 1994 Stanley Cup champion teammates Brian Leetch, Mark Messier and Mike Richter as well as Ranger greats Rod Gilbert and Ed Giacomin in the rafters of Madison Square Garden. #9 was also retired for Graves by his junior hockey team, the Windsor Spitfires.

In the 2009 book 100 Ranger Greats, the authors ranked Graves at No. 13 all-time of the 901 New York Rangers who had played during the team's first 82 seasons.

Awards and achievements
Member of two Stanley Cup winning teams: 1990 with the Edmonton Oilers and 1994 with the New York Rangers
Selected to one NHL All-Star Game: 1994
Named to the second All-Star team: 
Winner of the 1994 King Clancy Memorial Trophy
Winner of the 2001 Bill Masterton Memorial Trophy
New York Rangers retired his jersey number 9 on February 3, 2009

Career statistics

Regular season and playoffs

International

Transactions
November 2, 1989: Traded by the Detroit Red Wings, along with Petr Klima, Joe Murphy and Jeff Sharples to the Edmonton Oilers in exchange for Jimmy Carson, Kevin McClelland and Edmonton's 1991 5th-round draft choice.
September 3, 1991: Signed as a free agent by the New York Rangers.
2001: Traded by the New York Rangers with future considerations to the San Jose Sharks for Mikael Samuelsson.

See also 
List of NHL players with 50-goal seasons
List of NHL players with 1000 games played
List of NHL players who have signed offer sheets

References 

Lemieux Is Sidelined Amid Slash Controversy- New York Times

External links 

Madison Square Garden, Adam Graves and My First Day as a Ranger — by Jeff Ulmer

1968 births
Living people
Adirondack Red Wings players
Bill Masterton Memorial Trophy winners
Canadian ice hockey right wingers
Detroit Red Wings draft picks
Detroit Red Wings players
Edmonton Oilers players
King Clancy Memorial Trophy winners
National Hockey League All-Stars
National Hockey League players with retired numbers
New York Rangers players
San Jose Sharks players
Ice hockey people from Toronto
Stanley Cup champions
Windsor Spitfires players